8tv is a Malaysian Chinese-language free-to-air television (formerly both English and Chinese-language free-to-air television) network focused on the Chinese community of Malaysia. Its programming consists of mostly dramas, sitcoms and reality shows made in Chinese, either produced in Malaysia or imported from other countries, such as Hong Kong, China, Taiwan and Singapore, the occasional Korean drama is target for Malay viewers.

History

As MetroVision 
Television channel 8TV began official broadcasts on 1 July 1995, then known as MetroVision. It was managed by City Television Sdn Bhd, part of the Melewar Group, which was controlled by a member of the Negeri Sembilan royal family. Other shareholders included Utusan Malaysia, Medan Mas and Diversified Systems. The first broadcast license granted to MetroVision was only for the Klang Valley (appx. 3 million viewers). MetroVision transmitted on UHF channel 27 from Gunung Ulu Kali (near Genting Highlands). It was first available only in Klang Valley, Seremban, parts of Pahang and Malacca, but later expanded to Kedah and Johor, also being receivable from Singapore. Metrovision had a Malay news programme named Warta Prima.

By the end of 1996, MetroVision was sold to a new owner. Due to the Asian financial crisis and overcrowding from other channels and pay-TV operators (such as Astro, Mega TV and NTV7), MetroVision shut down on 1 November 1999. The operator promised to re-start the channel in March 2000 after a supposed "signal upgrade" but that did not materialise.

Renamed 8TV and early history 

On 8 January 2004, MetroVision was relaunched as and rebranded into 8TV under the entity of Metropolitan TV Sdn Bhd after the company was brought by Media Prima in 2003 with few Chinese, Malay and English contents in the beginning. Throughout its history, all the contents were gradually replaced by Chinese content as more of them were added to the channel's broadcasting slot. Mandarin is used in all of its news broadcasts nowadays and there was also a short-lived Malay news broadcast that was available in the channel's early years.

As a Chinese-oriented TV channel, 8TV broadcasts more Chinese programmes and movies and hold its own Chinese New Year campaign in conjunction with the Chinese New Year celebrations every year. As part of the campaign, the TV company distributes its Chinese New Year singles discography in competition with rival Astro since 2009. (Astro began to distribute Chinese New Year singles since 2008.) Beginning from 2015, 8TV release and distribute its Chinese New Year singles yearly with its own themes, theme songs and mascots based on the 12 animal zodiac as well as its related merchandise (e.g. soft toys). Over the years, it also collaborate with other Media Prima partners for the singles such as 8FM (formerly One FM) and NTV7. In addition, the discography team also tour across the country to promote their discography and its merchandise. The singles' Compact Discs can also be bought at Popular Bookstore CD Rama kiosks nationwide during the festive season. (Astro already have its own 12 animal zodiac campaign since 2010.) The 2023 CNY theme Full score Love You Rabbit (Chinese: 活力满分Love You兔, Pinyin: Huólì mǎnfēn love you tù) is used on air until the closing of 2022 Winter Olympics.

Programme rescheduling 
A programme reschedule was implemented on 1 April 2016, with almost all Chinese programmes shown on Saturdays to Tuesdays, while English programmes retain their time slots as usual on Wednesdays to Fridays, but by June 2017, 8TV broadcast only one English programme, which broadcasts every Friday.

The rescheduling also includes a 3-hour morning home shopping block titled CJ Wow Shop (now Wow Shop) which had also been introduced across other Media Prima channels, some more affected by the changes (especially sister channels NTV7 and TV9). However, this block has attract huge criticism on social media as it replaced a large part of daytime schedule, which these slots had been previously running mostly reruns, religious programming and kids programming. The programme was initially broadcast in Malay on the channel like its sister channel before being broadcast in Mandarin beginning 8 January 2017 onwards.

In 2017, 8TV signed a strategic cooperation agreement with the China International Communication Center. On 5 March 2018, 8TV became an independent first Chinese-language television channel and all 8TV's English programming was moved to NTV7 while NTV7's Mandarin programming was moved to 8TV as early as March 2018, due to the former changing its audience focus. On 8 June 2020, the day after Mandarin 7 aired its last edition on NTV7, 8TV's Primetime Mandarin News was extended to 1 hour.

On 11 February 2021, 8TV has started its HDTV broadcasting in conjunction of Chinese New Year and available exclusively through myFreeview DTT service on channel 108.

On 4 May 2021, this channel started 24 hours a day due to 8FM launch simulcast radio every midnight.

See also
 8FM
 List of television stations in Malaysia
 TV3
 DidikTV KPM
 TV9
 Media Prima
 New Straits Times
 Berita Harian

References

External links 
 

1995 establishments in Malaysia
2004 establishments in Malaysia
Media Prima
Television stations in Malaysia
Television channels and stations established in 1995
Television channels and stations established in 2004
Mass media in Petaling Jaya
Chinese-language television